The Reverse Be My Lot is a 1937 British drama film directed by Raymond Stross and starring Ian Fleming, Marjorie Corbett and Mickey Brantford. The screenplay involves a physician who discovers a medicine to combat a major outbreak of disease. The film is based on a novel by Margaret Morrison.

Cast
 Ian Fleming as Doctor Murray 
 Marjorie Corbett as Margaret 
 Mickey Brantford as Ralph 
 Georgie Harris as George 
 Jack Hellier as Jackie 
 Helen Goss as Helen 
 Audrene Brier as Bubbles 
 Aubrey Mallalieu as Doctor Davidson

References

External links

1937 films
Films directed by George King
British black-and-white films
British drama films
1937 drama films
Films shot at Rock Studios
1930s English-language films
1930s British films